Osmia californica is a megachilid bee, or mason bee. Native to North America, the mason bees are important pollinators.  O. californica generally emerges a little later in the spring than the better known orchard mason bee (O. lignaria).  Like the orchard mason bee, O. californica is a solitary nester.

References 

californica
Hymenoptera of North America
Insects of the United States
Insects described in 1864
Taxa named by Ezra Townsend Cresson